Andreas Schlißke (born 5 June 1957) is a German hurdler. He competed in the men's 110 metres hurdles at the 1980 Summer Olympics, representing East Germany.

References

External links
 

1957 births
Living people
Athletes (track and field) at the 1980 Summer Olympics
German male hurdlers
Olympic athletes of East Germany
Place of birth missing (living people)